Nitellopsis is a genus of charophyte green algae. Some sources, including AlgaeBase, place it in the family Feistiellaceae. Others place it in the family Characeae.

Species
, AlgaeBase listed the following species:
Extant
Nitellopsis obtusa 
Nitellopsis sarcularis 
Extinct
†Nitellopsis aemula 
†Nitellopsis dutemplei 
†Nitellopsis etrusca 
†Nitellopsis exilis 
†Nitellopsis globula 
†Nitellopsis helicteres 
†Nitellopsis helvetica 
†Nitellopsis houi 
†Nitellopsis huangii 
†Nitellopsis ixtapensis 
†Nitellopsis major 
†Nitellopsis merianii 
†Nitellopsis morulosa 
†Nitellopsis ovalis 
†Nitellopsis ovata 
†Nitellopsis palaeohungarica 
†Nitellopsis sigalii 
†Nitellopsis supraplana 
†Nitellopsis thaleri 
†Nitellopsis usboensis 
†Nitellopsis wangii 
†Nitellopsis wonnacottii

References

Charophyta
Charophyta genera